Paul Norman (born December 18, 1951) is an American game designer, musician, composer, and computer programmer.

Paul Norman (born December 18, 1951) is an American game designer, musician, composer, and computer programmer. He has been active in the music scene since 1970 and has been involved with the development of computer entertainment and information since 1982, including the production of Forbidden Forest in 1983.

Career

Early career 
Norman spent fifteen years working as a professional touring and studio musician.

Forbidden Forest 
Norman programmed his first major computer program in the 1980s; a video game called Forbidden Forest. Norman's stated aim was to create an almost-cinematic experience, and he used 6502 machine language to program the game. Forbidden Forest was originally developed for a company known as Synchro, which went out of business when the game was about three-quarters complete. However, the game was eventually bought out by Cosmi and brought to completion. The finished game was described as a "technical masterpiece" by Retro Gamer. The game was released in 1983.

Aztec Challenge 
Norman's second title was a graphic adventure game named Aztec Challenge, which was released in 1983 for the Commodore 64. A game with the same title but a different gameplay style was released for the Atari 8-bit. Norman authored the game's music, programming, and game design. Like his previous game, Aztec Challenge received praise for its "high standard of graphics and sound" from the game magazine publication Your Commodore. [citation needed]

Caverns of Khafka and Super Huey 
Following the release of Aztec Challenge, Norman developed another game titled Caverns of Khafka, inspired by an Atari 8-bit computer game of the same name by Robert Bonifacio. The game was released sometime between 1983-1984.

On the development of Super Huey (claimed to be the first helicopter simulator launched on the gaming market), Norman cites the television show Airwolf and the movie Blue Thunder as inspirations for its gameplay. The game went on to sell over two million copies. A Steam version of the game and its sequel were made available to the public in 2021.

1990s to present day 
In 1990, Norman joined a CD-ROM development team at Tiger Media, acting as a scriptwriter, audio and music producer, creator, and engineer. After two years as a design consultant for Sega, he was contracted to produce audio and video content for the Discovery Channel Software titled Carriers: Fortress at Sea.

Between 1995 to 1999, Norman took on a consultant and contributor role for internet projects, using Java programming to handle various responsibilities, from GUI to data processing. He spent the next two years developing ideas and methods for a better model of Internet presentations and entertainment, employing Adobe Flash and Caligari Truespace as tools. Later, he developed a web system for learning to play musical instruments, including guitar, piano, and harmonica. Unfortunately, although the website was launched in 2014, it is no longer available to the public.

Games

References

External links
 Digittarius - Official Web Site of Paul Norman

1951 births
American video game designers
Place of birth missing (living people)
Living people